The Indonesia women's national field hockey team is made up of the best field hockey players in Indonesia. As of 20 December 2022, the team is ranked 69th in the world, and 13th in Asia, by the International Hockey Federation. The governing body for the sports is the Indonesia Hockey Federation.

Competition history
A red box around the year indicates tournaments played within Indonesia and best results"

Asia Cup

AHF Cup

Asian Games

FIH Hockey Series

Southeast Asian Games

See also
 Indonesia men's national field hockey team

References 

Asian women's national field hockey teams
Field hockey
National team